The Whitewater River is a tributary of the Metolius River in the U.S. state of Oregon. It flows generally east from Whitewater Glacier on Mount Jefferson, west-southwest of Warm Springs in Jefferson County. The stream lies entirely within the Warm Springs Indian Reservation.

See also
 List of rivers of Oregon

References

Rivers of Jefferson County, Oregon
Rivers of Oregon